Vlado Zadro (born 17 March 1987) is a professional Bosnian-Herzegovinian football player who primarily played as a midfielder

Playing career 
Zadro began his career in 2005 with HŠK Zrinjski Mostar in the Premier League of Bosnia and Herzegovina. During his tenure with Mostar his achievements included a league title, and the Bosnia and Herzegovina Football Cup. He featured in the 2009–10 UEFA Champions League against ŠK Slovan Bratislava, and also participated in the 2010–11 UEFA Europa League. In 2012, he signed with NK Zagreb of the Croatian First Football League, where he appeared in total of 18 matches. He returned to Bosnia in 2013 with play with FK Sarajevo.

Following a season in Bosnia he returned to Croatia to play in the Croatian Second Football League with NK Solin. After a short spell abroad he returned home to sign with NK Široki Brijeg. During his time with Brijeg he featured in the 2014–15 UEFA Europa League against FK Mladá Boleslav. In 2015, he went overseas to play in the Canadian Soccer League with Toronto Croatia.

References 

1987 births
Living people
Sportspeople from Mostar
Croats of Bosnia and Herzegovina
Association football midfielders
Bosnia and Herzegovina footballers
Bosnia and Herzegovina under-21 international footballers
HŠK Zrinjski Mostar players
NK Zagreb players
FK Sarajevo players
NK Solin players
NK Široki Brijeg players
Toronto Croatia players
Premier League of Bosnia and Herzegovina players
Croatian Football League players
First Football League (Croatia) players
Canadian Soccer League (1998–present) players
Bosnia and Herzegovina expatriate footballers
Expatriate footballers in Croatia
Bosnia and Herzegovina expatriate sportspeople in Croatia
Expatriate soccer players in Canada
Bosnia and Herzegovina expatriate sportspeople in Canada